Richardville may refer to:

Jean Baptiste Richardville, the last chief of a united Miami tribe
Richardville House, his house built near Fort Wayne, Indiana, U.S.
Randy Richardville, state senator from Michigan, U.S.
Richardville County, former name of Howard County, Indiana, U.S.
Richardville Township, Minnesota, a township in Kittson County, Minnesota, U.S.

See also
Richardsville (disambiguation)